Jimmy Kitchens (born April 26, 1962) is an American former stock car racing driver. He participated in both the Busch Series as well as the Craftsman Truck Series. In 1998, he became part of the famed Alabama Gang. He was employed at Stewart Haas Racing as Ryan Newman's spotter.

Racing career

Craftsman Truck Series
In 2000, Kitchens made his first and only career start in the Craftsman Truck Series at Daytona International Speedway. After qualifying his No. 42 Dodge Motorsports Chevrolet 25th on the grid, Kitchens led three laps, but was later involved in an accident, prompting him to finish 28th.

Busch Series
Kitchens added seven of starts in 2003, but only finished one race  at Chicagoland, where he finished 24th. He start and parked for the other six races, and failed to qualify for four others.

Motorsports career results

NASCAR
(key) (Bold – Pole position awarded by qualifying time. Italics – Pole position earned by points standings or practice time. * – Most laps led.)

Busch Series

Craftsman Truck Series

Winston West Series

ARCA Bondo/Mar-Hyde Series
(key) (Bold – Pole position awarded by qualifying time. Italics – Pole position earned by points standings or practice time. * – Most laps led.)

References

External links
 

1962 births
ARCA Menards Series drivers
living people
NASCAR drivers
people from Hueytown, Alabama
racing drivers from Alabama
sportspeople from Birmingham, Alabama